Patrick Glöckner (born 18 November 1976) is a German professional football manager and former player who last managed Hansa Rostock.

Playing career
As a player, he played as a midfielder in the 2. Bundesliga with Eintracht Frankfurt and Stuttgarter Kickers, and also for Kickers Offenbach and FSV Frankfurt.

Managerial career
Having previously held the role of assistant manager at Eintracht Frankfurt II, FC St. Pauli and Viktoria Köln, he became the permanent manager at Viktoria Köln in the summer of 2019. He left the club on 13 May 2019, one game prior to the end of the season with Köln top of the table, and was appointed as the manager of 3. Liga side Chemnitzer FC in September 2019. His Chemnitz side were relegated to the Regionalliga in his first season at the club. He moved to Waldhof Mannheim for the 2020–21 season. He left Mannheim in May 2022. In November 2022, he was appointed as the new head coach of Hansa Rostock. On 20 March 2023, Patrick was relieved of his duties as Hansa Rostock manager with immediate effect.

References

External links
Patrick Glöckner at kickersarchiv.de

Living people
1976 births
German footballers
Association football midfielders
German football managers
People from Main-Kinzig-Kreis
Sportspeople from Darmstadt (region)
Footballers from Hesse
Eintracht Frankfurt II players
Eintracht Frankfurt players
Stuttgarter Kickers players
Stuttgarter Kickers II players
Kickers Offenbach players
FSV Frankfurt players
Regionalliga players
Oberliga (football) players
2. Bundesliga players
Eintracht Frankfurt non-playing staff
FC St. Pauli non-playing staff
FC Viktoria Köln managers
Chemnitzer FC managers
SV Waldhof Mannheim managers
3. Liga managers
FC Hansa Rostock managers
2. Bundesliga managers